
Year 117 (CXVII) was a common year starting on Thursday (link will display the full calendar) of the Julian calendar. At the time, it was known as the Year of the Consulship of Niger and Apronianus (or, less frequently, year 870 Ab urbe condita). The denomination 117 for this year has been used since the early medieval period, when the Anno Domini calendar era became the prevalent method in Europe for naming years.

Events

By place

Roman Empire 
 Trajan subdues a Jewish revolt (the Kitos War), then falls seriously ill, leaving Hadrian in command of the east.
 On his death bed, Trajan allegedly adopts Hadrian and designates him as his successor.
 August 9 - 11 – Emperor Trajan dies of a stroke at Selinus in Cilicia, age 63, while en route from Mesopotamia to Italy, leaving the Roman Empire at its maximal territorial extent. 
 Hadrian, who will reign until 138, succeeds him. 
 Hadrian, a Spaniard like Trajan, as Emperor inaugurates a policy of retrenchment and cultural integration, giving up the policy of conquest of his predecessor in order to consolidate the empire. 
 Hadrian returns large parts of Mesopotamia to the Parthians, as part of a peace settlement.
 Construction begins on the Pantheon in Rome.
 The Roman Empire reaches its greatest extent.

By topic

Commerce 
 The silver content of the Roman denarius falls to 87 percent under emperor Hadrian, down from 93 percent in the reign of Trajan.

Religion 
 John I becomes the 7th Bishop of Jerusalem.

Births 
 Aelius Aristides, Greek orator (d. 181)

Deaths 
 August 8 – Trajan, Roman emperor (b. AD 53)
 Gaius Cornelius Tacitus, Roman historian (b. AD 56) 
 Gaius Julius Quadratus Bassus, Roman general in Judea (b. AD 70)
 Hermione of Ephesus, Maurus, Pantalemon and Sergius, Astius and several other Christian martyrs in persecution by Trajan

References